The 2013 season for  began in January at the Tour Down Under. As a UCI ProTeam, they were automatically invited and obligated to send a squad to every event in the UCI World Tour.

For the 2013 season the team changed from using Wilier bikes to Merida bikes. Although Wilier had been contracted through to the end of the 2013 season, they cited that Lampre broke the terms and conditions of the contract, and terminated their technical sponsorship.

2013 roster

Riders who joined the team for the 2013 season

Riders who left the team during or after the 2012 season

Season victories

Footnotes

References

2013 road cycling season by team
UAE Team Emirates
2013 in Italian sport